Ted K is a 2021 American historical crime drama written, directed, produced, and edited by Tony Stone. It stars Sharlto Copley as an anti-tech radicalist Ted Kaczynski, also known as the Unabomber. The film depicts the events leading to his arrest.

Ted K premiered at the 71st Berlin International Film Festival on March 1, 2021 and was released in the United States by Neon's Super Ltd on February 18, 2022. The film received generally positive reviews from critics, with praise aimed towards Stone's direction and Copley's performance.

Plot
Since 1971, mathematics prodigy Ted Kaczynski has lived a primitive life in a remote cabin near Lincoln, Montana. He hunts for his food and lives without electricity or running water. He strongly believes modern technology is destroying the planet.

Kaczynski witnesses the destruction of the wilderness surrounding his cabin and concludes that living in nature is impossible. He goes to the library and acquires the address of Percy Wood, the president of United Airlines. He damages a neighbor's snowmobile, cuts down a power line, and destroys nearby construction equipment. He grows frustrated with the number of jets flying over his home, calling it his breaking point. To fight back against the destruction of nature, he creates a plan for revenge.

Kaczynski mails bombs to important people that he believes will harm society. The Federal Bureau of Investigation (FBI) becomes involved when a bomb injures and nearly kills Wood inside his house. Kaczynski changes his appearance by shaving his beard and slamming his nose against a cinder block. Computer store owner Hugh Scrutton is the first to die from one of his bombs.

Eighteen months later, Kaczynski is in desperate need of money. He argues with his brother David over the phone. He writes a 35,000-word manifesto and uses the word "we" when writing to local newspapers about the bombings. The country begins to refer to him as the "Unabomber". He sends a letter to The New York Times and The Washington Post, promising to stop his bombing spree if they publish his manifesto. The Washington Post complies on September 19, 1995.

David recognizes the prose style of the manifesto as Ted's and reports his suspicions. The FBI arrest Kaczynski in 1996. He is given life in a supermax prison in Florence, Colorado, for killing three people and injuring twenty-three others. An epilogue recognizes the manhunt for Ted Kaczynski as the largest in FBI history.

Cast

Production
Sharlto Copley announced his involvement in the film in early 2018. Musician Melissa Auf der Maur, Stone's wife, served as one of the executive producers.

Filming took place over four seasons in and around Lincoln, Montana.

Release
The film premiered at the 71st Berlin International Film Festival, on March 1, 2021. It was also screened at the Red Sea International Film Festival. In March 2021, Neon's Super Ltd acquired the film's distribution rights. Ted K was released in the United States on February 18, 2022.

Reception

Box office
In the United States and Canada, the film earned $20,851 from twenty-eight theaters in its opening weekend, and $2,385 from nine theaters in its second weekend.

Critical reception

 

Peter Bradshaw of The Guardian said "Copley excels behind a straggly beard in this portrait of the serial terror-bomber". Christy Lemire of RogerEbert.com praised Copley's performance, Tony Stone's direction, and the sound design but was critical of the reliance on fantasy sequences which she felt were unnecessary. Nadir Samara of Screen Rant criticized the two-hour runtime but said "it's Copley's performance that sells it."

Accolades

References

External links
 

2021 films
2020s historical drama films
American crime drama films
American historical films
Films about terrorism in the United States
Films directed by Tony Stone
Films set in Montana
Films shot in Montana
2020s English-language films
2020s American films